Judaeo-Spanish or Judeo-Spanish (autonym , Hebrew script: ,), also known as Ladino, is a Romance language derived from Old Spanish. Originally spoken in Spain, and then after the Edict of Expulsion spreading through the Ottoman Empire (the Balkans, Turkey, Western Asia, and North Africa) as well as France, Italy, the Netherlands, Morocco, and England, it is today spoken mainly by Sephardic minorities in more than 30 countries, with most speakers residing in Israel. Although it has no official status in any country, it has been acknowledged as a minority language in Bosnia and Herzegovina, Israel, France, and Turkey. In 2017, it was formally recognised by the Royal Spanish Academy.

The core vocabulary of Judaeo-Spanish is Old Spanish, and it has numerous elements from the other old Romance languages of the Iberian Peninsula: Old Aragonese, Astur-Leonese, Old Catalan, Galician-Portuguese, and Mozarabic. The language has been further enriched by Ottoman Turkish and Semitic vocabulary, such as Hebrew, Aramaic, and Arabic—especially in the domains of religion, law, and spirituality—and most of the vocabulary for new and modern concepts has been adopted through French and Italian. Furthermore, the language is influenced to a lesser degree by other local languages of the Balkans, such as Greek, Bulgarian, and Serbo-Croatian.

Historically, the Rashi script and its cursive form Solitreo have been the main orthographies for writing Judaeo-Spanish. However, today it is mainly written with the Latin alphabet, though some other alphabets such as Hebrew and Cyrillic are still in use. In Turkey, and formerly in the Ottoman Empire, it has been traditionally called  in Turkish, meaning the 'Jewish language.'

Judaeo-Spanish, once the Jewish trade language of the Adriatic Sea, the Balkans, and the Middle-East, and renowned for its rich literature, especially in Salonika, today is under serious threat of extinction. Most native speakers are elderly, and the language is not transmitted to their children or grandchildren for various reasons; consequently, all Judeo-Spanish-speaking communities are undergoing a language shift. In some expatriate communities in Spain, Latin America, and elsewhere, there is a threat of assimilation by modern Spanish. It is experiencing, however, a minor revival among Sephardic communities, especially in music.

Name 

 The 1903 Hebrew–Judeo-Spanish Haggadah entitled "", from the Sephardic community of Livorno, Italy, refers to the language used for explanation as the Sefaradi language.

The language is also called Judeo-Espanyol, Judeoespañol, Sefardí, Judío, and Espanyol or Español sefardita; Haquetía (from the Arabic  , 'tell') refers to the dialect of North Africa, especially Morocco. Judeo-Spanish has also been referred to as Judesmo (also Judezmo, Djudesmo or Djudezmo). However, in limited parts of Macedonia, its former use in the past as a low-register designation in informal speech by unschooled people has been documented. The dialect of the Oran area of Algeria was called Tetuani, after the Moroccan city of Tétouan since many Orani Jews came from there. In Hebrew, the language is called .

An entry in Ethnologue claims, "The name 'Judesmo' is used by Jewish linguists and Turkish Jews and American Jews; 'Judeo-Spanish' by Romance philologists; 'Ladino' by laymen, initially in Israel; 'Haketia' by Moroccan Jews; 'Spanyol' by some others." That does not reflect the historical usage.

More rarely, the bookish Judeo-Espanyol has also been used since the late 19th century.

In recent decades in Israel, followed by the United States and Spain, the language has come to be referred to as Ladino, literally meaning 'Latin'. Native speakers of the language consider the name Ladino to be incorrect, reserving the term for the "semi-sacred" language used in word-by-word translations from the Bible, which is distinct from the spoken vernacular. According to the website of the Jewish Museum of Thessaloniki, the cultural center of Sephardic Judaism after the expulsion from Spain,
"Ladino is not spoken, rather, it is the product of a word-for-word translation of Hebrew or Aramaic biblical or liturgical texts made by rabbis in the Jewish schools of Spain. In these translations, a specific Hebrew or Aramaic word always corresponded to the same Spanish word, as long as no exegetical considerations prevented this. In short, Ladino is only Hebrew clothed in Spanish, or Spanish with Hebrew syntax. The famous Ladino translation of the Bible, the Biblia de Ferrara (1553), provided inspiration for the translation of numerous Spanish Christian Bibles."

The derivation of the name Ladino is complicated. Before the expulsion of Jews from Spain, the word meant literary Spanish, as opposed to other dialects or Romance in general, as distinct from Arabic. In the Middle Ages, the word Latin was frequently used to mean simply 'language', particularly one understood: a latiner or latimer meant a translator.) Following the Expulsion, Jews spoke of "the Ladino" to mean the word-for-word translation of the Bible into Old Spanish. By extension, it came to mean that style of Spanish generally in the same way that (among Kurdish Jews) Targum has come to mean Judeo-Aramaic and (among Jews of Arabic-speaking background) sharħ has come to mean Judeo-Arabic.

That Judaeo-Spanish ladino should not be confused with the ladino or Ladin language, spoken in part of Northeastern Italy and which has nothing to do with Jews or with Spanish beyond being a Romance language, a property that they share with French, Italian, Portuguese and Romanian.

Origins
At the time of the expulsion from Spain, the day-to-day language of the Jews of different regions of the peninsula was hardly, if at all, different from that of their Christian neighbours, but there may have been some dialect mixing to form a sort of Jewish lingua franca. There was, however, a special style of Spanish used for purposes of study or translation, featuring a more archaic dialect, a large number of Hebrew and Aramaic loanwords and a tendency to render Hebrew word order literally (meaning 'this night', was rendered  instead of the normal Spanish ). As mentioned above, authorities confine the term Ladino to that style.

Following the Expulsion, the process of dialect mixing continued, but Castilian Spanish remained by far the largest contributor. The daily language was increasingly influenced both by the language of study and by the local non-Jewish vernaculars, such as Greek and Turkish. It came to be known as Judesmo and, in that respect, the development is parallel to that of Yiddish. However, many speakers, especially among the community leaders, also had command of a more formal style, castellano, which was nearer to the Spanish at the time of the Expulsion.

Source languages

Spanish
The grammar, the phonology, and about 60% of the vocabulary of Judaeo-Spanish is essentially Spanish but, in some respects, it resembles the dialects in southern Spain and South America, rather than the dialects of Central Spain. For example, it has yeísmo ("she" is /  (Judaeo-Spanish), instead of ) as well as seseo.

In many respects, it reproduces the Spanish of the time of the Expulsion, rather than the modern variety, as it retains some archaic features such as the following:
 Modern Spanish j, pronounced , corresponds to two different phonemes in Old Spanish: x, pronounced , and j, pronounced . Judaeo-Spanish retains the original sounds.

Portuguese and other Iberian languages
However, the phonology of both the consonants and part of the lexicon is, in some respects, closer to Galician-Portuguese and Catalan than to modern Spanish. That is explained by direct influence but also because all three languages retained some of the characteristics of medieval Ibero-Romance languages that Spanish later lost. 
There was a mutual influence with the Judaeo-Portuguese of the Portuguese Jews.

Hebrew and Aramaic
Like other Jewish vernaculars, Judaeo-Spanish incorporates many Hebrew and Aramaic words, mostly for religious concepts and institutions.

Other languages
Judaeo-Spanish has absorbed some words from the local languages but sometimes Hispanicised their form:  ('nightingale'), from Persian (via Turkish) . It may be compared to the Slavic elements in Yiddish. Because of the large number of Arabic words in Spanish generally, it is not always clear whether some of these words were introduced before the Expulsion or adopted later; modern Spanish replaced some of these loans with Latinisms after the Reconquista, where Judaeo-Spanish speakers had no motivation to do so.

Phonology
Judaeo-Spanish phonology consists of 27 phonemes: 22 consonants and 5 vowels.

Consonants

Vowels

Phonological differences from Spanish
As exemplified in the Sources section above, much of the phonology of Judaeo-Spanish is similar to that of standard modern Spanish. Here are some exceptions:
 It is claimed that, unlike all other non-creole varieties of Spanish, Judaeo-Spanish does not contrast the trill  and the tap/flap . However, that claim is not universally accepted.
 The Judaeo-Spanish phoneme inventory includes separate  and :   ('newspaper') vs   ('to play'). Neither phoneme is used in modern Spanish, where they have been replaced by the  [x]:  ,  .
 Judaeo-Spanish has (at least in some varieties) little or no diphthongization of tonic vowels, e.g. in the following lullaby:
 (Judaeo-Spanish text) 
 (Equivalent Spanish) 
 (Translation) Sleep, Sleep, beloved little son, [...] close your beautiful little eyes, [...]
 There is a tendency to drop  at the end of a word or syllable, as in Andalusian Spanish and many other Spanish dialects in Spain and the Americas:  ->  ('God'),  ->  ('you have embittered'). The form , however, is usually explained as an example of folk etymology: taking the s as a plural ending (which it is not) and attributing it to Christian trinitarianism. Thus, removing the s produced a more clearly monotheistic word for God. Although the word  does not exist in any other form of Spanish, except as two conjugations of the verb ,  is often pronounced as  due to the aforementioned phonological phenomenon.

Morphology
Judaeo-Spanish is distinguished from other Spanish dialects by the presence of the following features:
 Judaeo-Spanish maintains the second-person pronouns / (informal singular),  (formal singular) and / (plural); the third-person  /  are also used in the formal register. The Spanish pronouns usted and  do not exist.
 In verbs, the preterite indicates that an action taken once in the past was also completed at some point in the past. That is as opposed to the imperfect, which refers to any continuous, habitual, unfinished or repetitive past action. Thus, "I ate falafel yesterday" would use the first-person preterite form of 'eat',  but "When I lived in Izmir, I ran five miles every evening" would use the first-person imperfect form, . Though some of the morphology has changed, usage is just as in normative Spanish.
 In general, Judaeo-Spanish uses the Spanish plural morpheme /-(e)s/. The Hebrew plural endings /-im/ and /-ot/ are used with Hebrew loanwords, as well as with a few words from Spanish: / ('thief'): ;  ('brother'): . Similarly, some loaned feminine nouns ending in -á can take either the Spanish or Hebrew plural:  ('synagogue'): . 
 Judaeo-Spanish contains more gendering cases than standard Spanish, prominently in adjectives, as well as in nouns and in the interrogative .

Verb conjugation
Regular conjugation for the present tense:

Regular conjugation in the preterite:

Regular conjugation in the imperfect:

Syntax 
Judaeo-Spanish follows Spanish for most of its syntax. (That is not true of the written calque language involving word-for-word translations from Hebrew, which scholars refer to as "Ladino", as described above.) Like Spanish, it generally follows a subject–verb–object word order, has a nominative-accusative alignment, and is considered a fusional or inflected language.

Orthography

The following systems of writing Judaeo-Spanish have been used or proposed.
 Traditionally, especially in religious texts, Judaeo-Spanish was printed in Hebrew writing (especially in Rashi script), a practice that was very common, possibly almost universal, until the 19th century. That was called aljamiado, by analogy with the equivalent use of the Arabic script. It occasionally persists, especially in religious use. Everyday written records of the language used Solitreo, a semi-cursive script similar to Rashi script that shifted to square letter for Hebrew/Aramaic words. Solitreo is clearly different from the Ashkenazi Cursive Hebrew used today in Israel, but it is also related to Rashi script. (A comparative table is provided in the article on Cursive Hebrew.) However, borrowed Hebrew words retain their Hebrew spelling, without vowels.
 The Greek alphabet and the Cyrillic script were used in the past, but this is rare or nonexistent nowadays.
 In Turkey, Judaeo-Spanish is most commonly written in the Turkish variant of the Latin alphabet. That may be the most widespread system in use today, as following the decimation of Sephardic communities throughout much of Europe (particularly in Greece and the Balkans) during The Holocaust, the greatest proportion of speakers remaining were Turkish Jews. However, the Judaeo-Spanish page of the Turkish Jewish newspaper Şalom now uses the Israeli system.
 The Israeli Autoridad Nasionala del Ladino promotes a phonetic transcription in the Latin alphabet, without making any concessions to Spanish orthography, and uses the transcription in its publication Aki Yerushalayim. The songs "" and "", below, and the text in the sample paragraph, below, are written using the system.
 The American Library of Congress has published the Romanization standard it uses. 
 Works published in Spain usually adopt the standard orthography of modern Spanish to make them easier for modern Spanish speakers to read. The editions often use diacritics to show where the Judaeo-Spanish pronunciation differs from modern Spanish.
 Pablo Carvajal Valdés and others have suggested adopting the orthography that was used at the time of the Expulsion.

Aki Yerushalayim orthography
Aki Yerushalayim magazine, owned by Autoridad Nasionala del Ladino, promotes the following orthography:

A dot is written between s and h (s·h) to represent  to avoid confusion with :   ('dream').
Unlike mainstream Spanish, stressed diacritics are not represented.
Loanwords and foreign names retain their original spelling, and q or w would be used only for such words.

Hebrew orthography
Judaeo-Spanish is traditionally written in a Hebrew-based script, specially in Rashi script and its Solitreo cursive variant. The Hebrew orthography is not regulated, but sounds are generally represented by the following letters:

History
In the medieval Iberian peninsula, now Spain and Portugal, Jews spoke a variety of Romance dialects. Following the 1490s expulsion from Spain and Portugal, most of the Iberian Jews resettled in the Ottoman Empire. Jews in the Ottoman Balkans, Western Asia (especially Turkey), and North Africa (especially Morocco) developed their own Romance dialects, with some influence from Hebrew and other languages, which became what is now known as Judaeo-Spanish. Later on, many Portuguese Jews also escaped to France, Italy, the Netherlands and England, establishing small groups in those nations as well, but these spoke early modern Spanish or Portuguese rather than Judaeo-Spanish.

Jews in the Middle Ages were instrumental in the development of Spanish into a prestige language. Erudite Jews translated Arabic and Hebrew works, often translated earlier from Greek, into Spanish. Christians translated them again into Latin for transmission to Europe.

Until recent times, the language was widely spoken throughout the Balkans, Turkey/Western Asia and North Africa, as Judaeo-Spanish had been brought there by the Jewish refugees.

The contact among Jews of different regions and languages, including Catalan, Leonese and Portuguese developed a unified dialect, differing in some aspects from the Spanish norm that was forming simultaneously in Spain, but some of the mixing may have already occurred in exile rather than in the Iberian Peninsula. The language was known as Yahudice (Jewish language) in the Ottoman Empire. In the late 18th century, Ottoman poet Enderunlu Fazıl (Fazyl bin Tahir Enderuni) wrote in his Zenanname: "Castilians speak the Jewish language but they are not Jews."

The closeness and mutual comprehensibility between Judaeo-Spanish and Spanish favoured trade among Sephardim, often relatives, from the Ottoman Empire to the Netherlands and the conversos of the Iberian Peninsula.

Over time, a corpus of literature, both liturgical and secular, developed. Early literature was limited to translations from Hebrew. At the end of the 17th century, Hebrew was disappearing as the vehicle for rabbinic instruction. Thus, a literature appeared in the 18th century, such as Me'am Lo'ez and poetry collections. By the end of the 19th century, the Sephardim in the Ottoman Empire studied in schools of the Alliance Israélite Universelle. French became the language for foreign relations, as it did for Maronites, and Judaeo-Spanish drew from French for neologisms. New secular genres appeared, with more than 300 journals, history, theatre, and biographies.

Given the relative isolation of many communities, a number of regional dialects of Judaeo-Spanish appeared, many with only limited mutual comprehensibility, largely because of the adoption of large numbers of loanwords from the surrounding populations, including, depending on the location of the community, from Greek, Turkish, Arabic and, in the Balkans, Slavic languages, especially Serbo-Croatian and Bulgarian. The borrowing in many Judaeo-Spanish dialects is so heavy that up to 30% of their vocabulary is of non-Spanish origin. Some words also passed from Judaeo-Spanish into neighbouring languages. For example, the word  'word' (Vulgar Latin ; Greek ), passed into Turkish, Greek and Romanian with the meaning 'bunk, hokum, humbug, bullshit' in Turkish and Romanian and 'big talk, boastful talk' in Greek (compare the English word palaver).

Judaeo-Spanish was the common language of Salonika during the Ottoman period. The city became part of Greece in 1912 and was subsequently renamed Thessaloniki. Despite the Great Fire of Thessaloniki and mass settlement of Christian refugees, the language remained widely spoken in Salonika until the deportation of 50,000 Salonikan Jews in the Holocaust during the Second World War. According to the 1928 census, the language had 62,999 native speakers in Greece. The figure drops down to 53,094 native speakers in 1940, but 21,094 citizens "usually" spoke the language.

Judaeo-Spanish was also a language used in Donmeh rites ( being a Turkish word for 'convert' to refer to adepts of Sabbatai Tsevi converting to Islam in the Ottoman Empire). Today, the religious practices and the ritual use of Judaeo-Spanish seems confined to elderly generations.

The Castilian colonisation of Northern Africa favoured the role of polyglot Sephards, who bridged between Spanish colonizers and Arab and Berber speakers.

From the 17th to the 19th centuries, Judaeo-Spanish was the predominant Jewish language in the Holy Land, but its dialect was different in some respects from the one in Greece and Turkey. Some families have lived in Jerusalem for centuries and preserve Judaeo-Spanish for cultural and folklore purposes although they now use Hebrew in everyday life.

An often-told Sephardic anecdote from Bosnia-Herzegovina has it that as a Spanish consulate was opened in Sarajevo in the interwar period, two Sephardic women passed by. Upon hearing a Catholic priest who was speaking Spanish, they thought that his language meant that he was Jewish.

In the 20th century, the number of speakers declined sharply: entire communities were murdered in the Holocaust, and the remaining speakers, many of whom emigrated to Israel, adopted Hebrew. The governments of the new nation-states encouraged instruction in the official languages. At the same time, Judaeo-Spanish aroused the interest of philologists, as it conserved language and literature from before the standardisation of Spanish.

Judaeo-Spanish is in a serious danger of extinction because many native speakers today are elderly olim (immigrants to Israel), who have not transmitted the language to their children or grandchildren. Nevertheless, it is experiencing a minor revival among Sephardic communities, especially in music. In addition, Sephardic communities in several Latin American countries still use Judaeo-Spanish. There, the language is exposed to the different danger of assimilation to modern Spanish.

Kol Yisrael and Radio Nacional de España hold regular radio broadcasts in Judaeo-Spanish. Law & Order: Criminal Intent showed an episode, titled "A Murderer Among Us", with references to the language. Films partially or totally in Judaeo-Spanish include Mexican film Novia que te vea (directed by Guita Schyfter), The House on Chelouche Street, and Every Time We Say Goodbye.

Efforts have been made to gather and publish modern Judaeo-Spanish fables and folktales. In 2001, the Jewish Publication Society published the first English translation of Judaeo-Spanish folktales, collected by Matilda Koen-Sarano, Folktales of Joha, Jewish Trickster: The Misadventures of the Guileful Sephardic Prankster. A survivor of Auschwitz, Moshe Ha-Elion, issued his translation into Judeo-Spanish of the ancient Greek epic The Odyssey in 2012, in his 87th year, and he is now translating the sister epic, the Iliad, into his mother tongue.

The language was initially spoken by the Sephardic Jewish community in India, but was later replaced with Judeo-Malayalam.

Literature
The first printed Ladino book was Me-'am lo'ez in 1730. It was a commentary on the Bible in the Ladino language. Most Jews in the Ottoman Empire knew the Hebrew alphabet but did not speak Hebrew. The printing of  marked the emergence of large-scale printing activity in Ladino in the western Ottoman Empire and in Istanbul in particular. The earliest Judaeo-Spanish books were religious in nature, mostly created to maintain religious knowledge for exiles who could not read Hebrew; the first of the known texts is  [The Rules of Ritual Slaughter and Inspection of Animals]; (Istanbul, 1510). Texts continued to be focussed on philosophical and religious themes, including a large body of rabbinic writings, until the first half of the 19th century. The largest output of secular Judaeo-Spanish literature occurred during the latter half of the 19th and the early 20th centuries in the Ottoman Empire. The earliest and most abundant form of secular text was the periodical press: between 1845 and 1939, Ottoman Sephardim published around 300 individual periodical titles. The proliferation of periodicals gave rise to serialised novels: many of them were rewrites of existing foreign novels into Judaeo-Spanish. Unlike the previous scholarly literature, they were intended for a broader audience of educated men and less-educated women alike. They covered a wider range of less weighty content, at times censored to be appropriate for family readings. Popular literature expanded to include love stories and adventure stories, both of which had been absent from Judaeo-Spanish literary canon. The literary corpus meanwhile also expanded to include theatrical plays, poems and other minor genres.

Multiple documents made by the Ottoman government were translated into Judaeo-Spanish; usually translators used terms from Ottoman Turkish.

Religious use
The Jewish communities of Sarajevo, Bosnia-Herzegovina, and Belgrade, Serbia, still chant part of the Sabbath Prayers (Mizmor David) in Judaeo-Spanish. The Sephardic Synagogue Ezra Bessaroth in Seattle, Washington, United States, was formed by Jews from Turkey and the Greek island of Rhodes, and it uses the language in some portions of its Shabbat services. The Siddur is called Zehut Yosef and was written by Hazzan Isaac Azose.

At Congregation Etz Ahaim of Highland Park, New Jersey, a congregation founded by Sephardic Jews from Salonika, a reader chants the Aramaic prayer B'rikh Shemay in Judaeo-Spanish before he takes out the Torah on Shabbat.

 is also included, alongside Ein Keloheinu, in Mishkan T'filah, the 2007 Reform prayerbook.

 is a Sephardic hymn often sung during the Havdalah service, its currently popular tune arranged by Judy Frankel. Hazzan Isaac Azose, cantor emeritus of Synagogue Ezra Bessaroth and second-generation Turkish immigrant, has performed an alternative Ottoman tune.

Rabbi Aryeh Kaplan translated some scholarly religious texts, including Me'am Loez into Hebrew, English or both.

Izmir's grand rabbis Haim Palachi, Abraham Palacci, and Rahamim Nissim Palacci all wrote in the language and in Hebrew.

Modern education and use 
As with Yiddish, Judaeo-Spanish is seeing a minor resurgence in educational interest in colleges across the United States and in Israel. Almost all American Jews are Ashkenazi, with a tradition based on Yiddish, rather than Judaeo-Spanish, and so institutions that offer Yiddish are more common.  the University of Pennsylvania and Tufts University offered Judaeo-Spanish courses among colleges in the United States. In Israel, Moshe David Gaon Center for Ladino Culture at Ben-Gurion University of the Negev is leading the way in education (language and literature courses, Community oriented activities) and research (a yearly scientific journal, international congresses and conferences etc.). Hebrew University also offers courses. The Complutense University of Madrid also used to have courses. Prof. David Bunis taught Judaeo-Spanish at the University of Washington, in Seattle during the 2013–14 academic year. Bunis returned to the University of Washington for the Summer 2020 quarter.

In Spain, the Spanish Royal Academy (RAE) in 2017 announced plans to create a Judaeo-Spanish branch in Israel in addition to 23 existing academies, in various Spanish-speaking countries, that are associated in the Association of Spanish Language Academies. Its stated purpose is to preserve Judaeo-Spanish. The move was seen as another step to make up for the Expulsion, following the offer of Spanish citizenship to Sephardim who had some connection with Spain.

Melis Alphan wrote in Hürriyet in 2017 that the Judaeo-Spanish language in Turkey was heading to extinction.

Samples

Comparison with other languages 
Note: Judaeo-Spanish samples in this section are generally written in the Aki Yerushalayim orthography unless otherwise specified.

Songs 
Folklorists have been collecting romances and other folk songs, some dating from before the expulsion. Many religious songs in Judeo-Spanish are translations of Hebrew, usually with a different tune. For example, here is Ein Keloheinu in Judeo-Spanish:

Other songs relate to secular themes such as love:

This makes Terach and his wife into Hebrews, as are the parents of other babies killed by Nimrod. In essence, unlike its Biblical model, the song is about a Hebrew community persecuted by a cruel king and witnessing the birth of a miraculous saviour—a subject of obvious interest and attraction to the Jewish people who composed and sang it in Medieval Spain.

The song attributes to Abraham elements that are from the story of Moses's birth, the cruel king killing innocent babies, with the midwives ordered to kill them, the 'holy light' in the Jewish area, as well as from the careers of Shadrach, Meshach, and Abednego who emerged unscathed from the fiery furnace, and Jesus of Nazareth. Nimrod is thus made to conflate the role and attributes of three archetypal cruel and persecuting kings:Nebuchadnezzar and Pharaoh and Herod

Another example is the Coplas de Purim, a folk song about Purim.

Selected words by origin 

Words derived from Arabic:
  – 'liberty, freedom'
  – 'Sunday'
  – 'to terminate'
  – 'money changer'
  – 'wood'
  – 'cemetery visit'

Words derived from Hebrew:
  – 'alphabet' (from the Hebrew names of the first two letters of the alphabet)
  – 'humble, obedient'
  – 'grave'
  – 'to arrange'
  – 'to reconsider'
  – 'blessing'
  – 'religious law'
  – 'community', 'synagogue'
  – 'how much?', 'how many?'
  – 'west'
  – 'story, event'
  – 'deluge, downpour, torrent'
  – 'star', 'destiny'
  – 'dead'
  – 'dead'
  – 'Purim present' (eerived from the Hebrew  + Turkic ending -lik)
  – 'charity'
  – 'prayer'
  – 'blessing'

Words derived from Persian:
  – 'tea'
  – 'plate'
  – 'money'
  – 'dizziness'

Words derived from Portuguese:
  – 'almighty, omnipotent' (referring to God)
  – 'yet'
  – 'hat'
  – 'black' (in color)
  – 'to change'

Words derived from Turkish:
  – 'axe'
  – 'to terminate'
  – 'to paint, color'
  – 'whim'
  – 'easy'
  – 'belt, girdle'
  – 'street, quarters, neighbourhood';  – 'Jewish quarters'

Modern singers 
Jennifer Charles and Oren Bloedow from the New York-based band Elysian Fields released a CD in 2001 called La Mar Enfortuna, which featured modern versions of traditional Sephardic songs, many sung by Charles in Judeo-Spanish. The American singer Tanja Solnik has released several award-winning albums that feature songs in the languages: From Generation to Generation: A Legacy of Lullabies and Lullabies and Love Songs. There are a number of groups in Turkey that sing in Judeo-Spanish, notably Janet – Jak Esim Ensemble, Sefarad, Los Pasharos Sefaradis and the children's chorus Las Estreyikas d'Estambol. There is a Brazilian-born singer of Sephardic origins, Fortuna, who researches and plays Judeo-Spanish music.

Israeli folk-duo Esther & Abi Ofarim recorded the song "Yo M'enamori d'un Aire" for their 1968 album Up To Date. Esther Ofarim recorded several Judaeo-Spanish songs as a solo artist. These included "", "", "", "" and "".

The Jewish Bosnian-American musician Flory Jagoda recorded two CDs of music taught to her by her grandmother, a Sephardic folk singer, among a larger discography.

The cantor Dr. Ramón Tasat, who learned Judeo-Spanish at his grandmother's knee in Buenos Aires, has recorded many songs in the language, with three of his CDs focusing primarily on that music.

The Israeli singer Yasmin Levy has also brought a new interpretation to the traditional songs by incorporating more "modern" sounds of Andalusian Flamenco. Her work revitalising Sephardic music has earned Levy the Anna Lindh Euro-Mediterranean Foundation Award for promoting cross-cultural dialogue between musicians from three cultures: In Yasmin Levy's own words:

I am proud to combine the two cultures of Ladino and flamenco, while mixing in Middle Eastern influences. I am embarking on a 500 years old musical journey, taking Ladino to Andalusia and mixing it with flamenco, the style that still bears the musical memories of the old Moorish and Jewish-Spanish world with the sound of the Arab world. In a way it is a 'musical reconciliation' of history.

Notable music groups performing in Judeo-Spanish include Voice of the Turtle, Oren Bloedow and Jennifer Charles' La Mar Enfortuna and Vanya Green, who was awarded a Fulbright Fellowship for her research and performance of this music. She was recently selected as one of the top ten world music artists by the We are Listening International World of Music Awards for her interpretations of the music.

Robin Greenstein, a New York-based musician, received a federal CETA grant in the 1980s to collect and perform Sephardic Music under the guidance of the American Jewish Congress. Her mentor was Joe Elias, noted Sephardic singer from Brooklyn. She recorded residents of the Sephardic Home for the Aged, a nursing home in Coney Island, New York, singing songs from their childhood. The voices recorded included Victoria Hazan, a well known Sephardic singer who recorded many 78's in Judaeo-Spanish and Turkish from the 1930s and 1940s. Two Judaeo-Spanish songs can be found on her Songs of the Season holiday CD, released in 2010 on Windy Records.

German band In Extremo also recorded a version of the above-mentioned song Avram Avinu.

The Israeli-German folk band Baladino has released two albums that have songs with lyrics in Judaeo-Spanish.

See also 

 Haketia
 Jewish languages
 Judaism
 Judeo-Gascon
 Judaeo-Portuguese
 Judaeo-Romance languages
 Judaeo-Spanish Wikipedia
 Knaanic language
 Mozarabic language
 Los Serenos Sefarad, Judaeo-Spanish hip-hop
 Laura Papo Bohoreta
 Matilda Koen-Sarano
 Sephardi Jews
 Tetuani Ladino
 Cicurel family
 Pallache family
 Şalom, a Turkish newspaper with a Judaeo-Spanish page
 El Amaneser, a Turkish  monthly newspaper in Judaeo-Spanish
 Aki Yerushalayim, an Israeli magazine in Judaeo-Spanish published 2–3 times a year
 Yiddish, language historically spoken by Ashkenazi Jews
 Judeo-Iranian languages, languages historically spoken by Mizrahi Jews in the former territories of the Persian Empire

References
Notes

Citations

Bibliography
 Barton, Thomas Immanuel (Toivi Cook) (2010) Judezmo Expressions. USA 
 Barton, Thomas Immanuel (Toivi Cook) (2008) Judezmo (Judeo-Castilian) Dictionary. USA 
 Bunis, David M. (1999) Judezmo: an introduction to the language of the Sephardic Jews of the Ottoman Empire. Jerusalem 
 Bunis, David M. (2015) Judezmo (Ladino). In Lily Kahn and Aaron D. Rubin (eds.), Handbook of Jewish languages, 366-451. Leiden: Brill.
 Габинский, Марк А. (1992) Сефардский (еврейской-испанский) язык (M. A. Gabinsky. Sephardic (Judeo-Spanish) language, in Russian).  Chişinău: Ştiinţa
 Harris, Tracy. 1994. Death of a language: The history of Judeo-Spanish. Newark, DE: University of Delaware Press.
 Hemsi, Alberto (1995) Cancionero Sefardí; edited and with an introduction by Edwin Seroussi (Yuval Music Series; 4.) Jerusaelem: The Jewish Music Research Centre, the Hebrew University of Jerusalem
 Hualde, José Ignacio (2013) "Intervocalic lenition and word-boundary effects: Evidence from Judeo-Spanish". Diachronica 30.2: 232–26.
 Kohen, Elli; Kohen-Gordon, Dahlia (2000) Ladino-English, English-Ladino: concise encyclopedic dictionary. New York: Hippocrene Books
 Markova, Alla (2008) Beginner's Ladino with 2 Audio CDs. New York: Hippocrene Books 
 Markus, Shimon (1965) Ha-safa ha-sefaradit-yehudit (The Judeo-Spanish language, in Hebrew). Jerusalem
 Minervini, Laura (1999) "The Formation of the Judeo-Spanish koiné: Dialect Convergence in the Sixteenth Century". In Proceedings of the Tenth British Conference on Judeo-Spanish Studies. Edited by Annete Benaim, 41–52. London: Queen Mary and Westfield College.
 Minervini, Laura (2006) "El desarollo histórico del judeoespañol", Revista Internacional de Lingüística Iberoamericana 4.2: 13–34.
 Molho, Michael (1950) Usos y costumbres de los judíos de Salónica
 Quintana Rodriguez, Aldina. 2001. Concomitancias lingüisticas entre el aragones y el ladino (judeoespañol). Archivo de Filología Aragonesa 57–58, 163–192.
Quintana Rodriguez, Aldina. 2006. Geografía lingüistica del judeoespañol: Estudio sincrónico y diacrónico. Bern: Peter Lang.
Sephiha, Haïm-Vidal. 1997. "Judeo-Spanish", in Weinstock, Nathan, Sephiha, Haïm-Vidal (with Anita Barrera-Schoonheere) Yiddish and Judeo-Spanish: a European Heritage. European Languages 6. Brussels: European Bureau for Lesser-Used Languages, 23–39.

Further reading
 Lleal, Coloma (1992) "A propósito de una denominación: el judeoespañol", available at Centro Virtual Cervantes, A propósito de una denominación: el judeoespañol
 Saporta y Beja, Enrique, comp. (1978) Refranes de los judíos sefardíes y otras locuciones típicas de Salónica y otros sitios de Oriente. Barcelona: Ameller

External links

 Autoridad Nasionala del Ladino 
 Ladino
 Jewish Museum of Thessaloniki
 Ladino Center
 Ladinokomunita, an email list in Ladino
 La pajina djudeo-espanyola de Aki Yerushalayim
 The Ladino Alphabet
 Judeo-Spanish (Ladino) at Orbis Latinus
 Ladino music by Suzy and Margalit Matitiahu
 Socolovsky, Jerome. "Lost Language of Ladino Revived in Spain", Morning Edition, National Public Radio, 19 March 2007.
 A randomly selected example of use of ladino on the Worldwide Web: La komponente kulinaria i linguístika turka en la kuzina djudeo-espanyola
 Israeli Ladino Language Forum (Hebrew)
 LadinoType – A Ladino Transliteration System for Solitreo, Meruba, and Rashi
 Habla Ladino? Sephardim meet to preserve language Friday 9 January 1998
 Edición SEFARAD, Radio programme in Ladino from Radio Nacional de España
 Etext of Nebrija's Gramática de la lengua castellana, showing orthography of Old Spanish.
 Sefarad, Revista de Estudios Hebraicos, Sefardíes y de Oriente Próximo, ILC, CSIC
 Judæo-Spanish Language (Ladino) and Literature, Jewish Encyclopedia
 Dr Yitshak (Itzik) Levy An authentic documentation of Ladino heritage and culture 
 Sephardic Studies Digital Library & Museum  – UW Stroum Jewish Studies 
 "Ladino" or not "Ladino"?, David M. Bunis.
 An inside look into the Portuguese corpus of words in Nehama's Dictionnaire du Judeo-Espagnol Yossi Gur, 2003.
 Ladino Romanization standard used by the Library of Congress

 
Judaeo-Spanish languages
Endangered Romance languages
Sephardi Jewish culture
Languages of Turkey
Languages of Greece
Languages of Spain
Diaspora languages
Endangered diaspora languages
Languages of Israel
Languages attested from the 16th century